Ho Chi Minh in Siam is a 2015 Vietnamese film directed by Bui Tuan Dung, written by Dinh Thien Phuc, music composed by Hoang Luong and produced by Hoda Film.

Plot 
The story about the uptime of leader Ho Chi Minh in the years from 1927 to 1929 in Thailand and his journey from Bangkok to U-Don Thani, a province in northeastern of Thailand.

Cast 
 Nguyen Manh Truong as Thau Chin
 [Hoang Hai] as Paul Hung
 Bui Trung Anh as Dang Thuc Hua
 Huyen Sam as Dang Quynh Anh
  as Nho

References 
 Thầu Chín Ở Xiêm chạm tới trái tim khán giả.
 Thầu Chín Ở Xiêm tạo chất lãng mạn với cô gái cảm mến Nguyễn Ái Quốc.

External links 

Vietnamese historical films